"The Rhumba Boogie" is a 1951 song written and originally performed by Hank Snow.

Chart performance
The single was his follow up to "The Golden Rocket".  "The Rhumba Boogie" was Hank Snow's third number one in a row on the Country & Western Best Seller chart where it stayed at the top for eight weeks and a total of twenty-seven weeks on the chart.

Cover versions
The song was also recorded by Spade Cooley & his Fiddlin' Friends (DECCA 9-46310) with a vocal by Ginny Jackson, and released in March 1951.

References

Hank Snow songs
1951 singles
1951 songs
RCA Victor singles
Songs written by Hank Snow